The following table is a season-by-season summary of league performances for Trabzonspor.

Key

1960s

1970s

1980s

1990s

2000s

2010s

References
All league statistics from turkish-soccer.com
All European statistics from The Rec.Sport.Soccer Statistics Foundation

Seasons
 
Trabzonspor